Meliosma rigida, the stiff-leaved meliosma, is a species of flowering plant in the family Sabiaceae. It is native to Laos, Vietnam, southern China, Taiwan, Japan, the Ryukyu Islands, and the Philippines.

Subtaxa
The following varieties are accepted:
Meliosma rigida var. pannosa (Hand.-Mazz.) Y.W.Law
Meliosma rigida var. rigida

References

rigida
Flora of Japan
Flora of Laos
Flora of South-Central China
Flora of Southeast China
Flora of Taiwan
Flora of the Philippines
Flora of the Ryukyu Islands
Flora of Vietnam
Plants described in 1845
Taxa named by Joseph Gerhard Zuccarini